Ciladopa (AY-27,110) is a dopamine agonist with a similar chemical structure to dopamine. It was under investigation as an antiparkinsonian agent but was discontinued due to concerns of tumorogenesis in rodents.

References 

Dopamine agonists
Phenylethanolamines
Piperazines
Catechol ethers
Tropones